The Moscow State University of Technology "STANKIN" (MSUT "STANKIN") (Russian: Московский Государственный Технологический Университет "СТАНКИН" (МГТУ "СТАНКИН")), previously the Moscow Machine and Tool Institute (Russian: Московский станкоинструментальный институт, tr. Moskovsky stankoinstrumental'ny institut), the name of which is still preserved in the acronym STANKIN (Russian: СТАНКИН), is a Russian technical higher education institution founded in 1930. Today STANKIN trains specialists in machinery, robotics, CNC's, electronics, automation and control systems, economics of enterprises, informatics and measurement systems.

History 

The university was founded as the Moscow Machine Tool Institute in 1930 to provide the machine tool industry, the most important branch of industry at that time, with qualified specialists.

Today STANKIN is a scientific industrial complex with the Technological Design Institute of Informatic of the Russian Academy of Sciences (RSA). There is a network of scientific, educational and industrial centers. It represents the main perspective in engineers and scientists training through post-graduate study (six special Doctors and Bachelors councils function under the university). It has relations with universities and firms from Austria, Brazil, Germany, Hungary, Italy, China, USA, South Korea and other countries.

There are more than 600 professors and scientists working at Stankin today. Stankin has its own newspaper Stankinovskiy vestnik and a peer-reviewed journal with an international editorial board Vestnik MGTU STANKIN from 2009 (English: MSUT STANKIN Messenger) included in Web of Science databases.

Notable alumni 
Mikhail Fradkov, Prime Minister of Russia;
Mikhail Mishustin, Prime Minister of Russia;
Dmitry Chernyshenko, Deputy Prime Minister of Russia.

Education 

Studies and corresponding research cover the areas of automation of technological processes and manufactures; engineering ecology and security in machine building; information and marketing in machine building; information systems;
quality of production and management; computerization of computation durability of machine building construction; computer modeling in instrumental technics; computer control system in production and business; tool engineering and computer modeling;
laser technology; presses and metal treatment technology; metal cutting machines and tools; design and computer modeling of plastic deformation system; robotics and mechatronic systems; system production of automated technological machinery; computer-aided design systems; metrological production system; computer control machine tools; technological information of automated manufacturing technology; technology and business in no-waste production; technology and management in instrumental manufacturing; mechanical engineering; physics of high concentrated energy; economy and control of production.

Research

Contracts with foreign firms and universities
 The agreement for scientific and technical cooperation with Technical University of Berlin, University of Stuttgart.
 Together with Technical university of Budapest there is a preparation of masters and doctors of sciences.
 The contract with the firm TONGIL Heavy, Ltd. (Southern Korea)
 Cooperation with the firm REVINGTON GROUP (USA)
 Scientific and technical cooperation with the institute ITRI (Taiwan)
 Joint scientific - educational laboratory with the firm HP (USA)

References

External links 
  Official site of STANKIN

Universities in Moscow
Universities and institutes established in the Soviet Union
Technical universities and colleges in Russia